Nothing Safe: Best of the Box is the first greatest hits album by the American rock band Alice in Chains. It was released on June 29, 1999 on Columbia Records. The previously unreleased track "Get Born Again" was released as a single to promote the album and peaked at No. 4 on Billboards Mainstream Rock Tracks chart, and at No. 12 on the Modern Rock Tracks chart. "Get Born Again" was also nominated for the Grammy Award for Best Hard Rock Performance in 2000.

Overview
The album is the first of Alice in Chains's best-of albums, and also served as a sampler for their Music Bank box set. Nothing Safe contains newly remastered tracks from previous albums Facelift, Sap, Dirt, Jar of Flies, Alice in Chains and Unplugged, as well as the previously unreleased track "Get Born Again", recorded between September and October 1998.

Despite the "Best of the Box" album subtitle, this compilation includes several tracks not found on the Music Bank box set.

The demo version of "We Die Young" was previously unreleased and did not appear on Music Bank. This track remains exclusive to this collection. 

The live version of "Rooster" found here was also previously unreleased, and similarly, did not appear on Music Bank. However, this track was re-released in 2000 on the compilation, Live.

The remastered, "unplugged" version of "Got Me Wrong" was also omitted from Music Bank.

The version of "What The Hell Have I" that appears here is the original version mixed by Andy Wallace, not the version remixed by Toby Wrught that appears on Music Bank.

The newly remastered version of "Again" that is found on Nothing Safe was also left off of the Music Bank compilation in favor of a techno/electronic dance remix of the song called, "Again (Tattoo Of Pain Mix)".

Unlike the version found on Music Bank, "Iron Gland" is featured with the beginning drum found on the Dirt track "Dam That River". 

Because of these differences, many fans consider Nothing Safe to be a companion piece to the Music Bank box set.

A "Best Buy Exclusive" issue of the CD included a bonus disc in a cardboard sleeve, with live versions of "Angry Chair" and "Man in the Box". 

Release and reception
The album was certified platinum by the RIAA, and the revenue generated from the album was used to fund the Music Bank box set.

The album has received mainly positive reviews, with critics praising the compilation's inclusion of rare material, along with the band's hits. AllMusic staff writer Steve Huey gave the album a four star rating writing "The package is not unattractive, since nearly all the hits are present in some form; also included are the new song "Get Born Again" and the better of the group's two contributions to the Last Action Hero soundtrack, "What the Hell Have I."

Bill Adams of Ground Control Magazine, reviewing Alice in Chains Discography wrote "To its credit, Nothing Safe is a solid compilation of odds, ends, live tracks, studio cuts, soundtrack appearances and rarities, which serves its purpose for giving 'in-passing' fans a pretty enjoyable set".

Track listing

iTunes release

Personnel

Jerry Cantrell – Lead and rhythm guitar, backing vocals, lead vocals on "Grind", co-lead vocals on "Would?"
Layne Staley – Lead vocals, rhythm guitar on "Angry Chair"
Sean Kinney – Drums
Mike Starr – Bass (tracks 2–8, 15)
Mike Inez – Bass (tracks 1, 9–14)
Tom Araya – vocals on "Iron Gland"
Alice in Chains – Producer
Bryan Carlstrom – engineer
Ronnie S. Champagne – engineer
Alex Coletti – producer
John Harris – engineer
Dave Jerden – producer, engineer, mixing
Stephen Marcussen – mastering

Rick Parashar – producer
Andy Wallace – mixing
Tony Wilson – producer
Toby Wright – producer, engineer, mixing
Tom Nellen – engineer
Peter Fletcher – producer, compilation producer
Mike Walter – engineer
Rocky Schenck – photography
Mary Maurer – art direction, design
Danny Clinch – photography
Marty Temme – photography
Brandy Flower – design
Young Sun Lim – artwork, art direction
Chris McCann – photography

Chart positions

Album

SinglesI''' Peaked on the Bubbling Under Hot 100 Singles chart, a 25-song extension to the original Billboard'' Hot 100 chart.

Certifications

References

External links

1999 greatest hits albums
Alice in Chains compilation albums
Albums produced by Tony Wilson
Columbia Records compilation albums